Shohada Rural District is a rural district (dehestan) in Yaneh Sar District, Behshahr County, Mazandaran Province, Iran. At the 2006 census, its population was 3,341, in 970 families. The rural district has 17 villages.

References 

Rural Districts of Mazandaran Province
Behshahr County